The common hepatic duct is the first part of the biliary tract. It joins the cystic duct coming from the gallbladder to form the common bile duct.

Structure 
The common hepatic duct is the first part of the biliary tract. It is formed by the convergence of the right hepatic duct (which drains bile from the right functional lobe of the liver) and the left hepatic duct (which drains bile from the left functional lobe of the liver). It then joins the cystic duct coming from the gallbladder to form the common bile duct.

The duct is usually 6–8 cm long. The common hepatic duct is about 6 mm in diameter in adults, with some variation. The inner surface is covered in a simple columnar epithelium.

Variation 
Around 1.7% of people have additional accessory hepatic ducts that join onto the common hepatic duct.

Rarely, the common hepatic duct joins onto the gallbladder directly, leading to illness.

Function 
The hepatic duct is part of the biliary tract that transports secretions from the liver into the intestines.

Clinical significance

Cholecystectomy 
The common hepatic ducts carries a higher volume of bile in people who have had their gallbladder removed.

The common hepatic duct is an important anatomic landmark during surgeries such as cholecystectomy. It forms one edge of Calot's triangle, along with the cystic duct and the cystic artery. All constituents of this triangle must be identified to avoid cutting or clipping the wrong structure.

Cholestasis 
A diameter of more than 8 mm is regarded as abnormal dilatation, and is a sign of cholestasis.

Mirizzi's syndrome 
Mirizzi's syndrome occurs when the common hepatic duct is blocked by gallstones.

Additional images

References

External links
  - "Stomach, Spleen and Liver: Contents of the Hepatoduodenal Ligament"
 Illustration

Digestive system
Hepatology